The Chahar People's Anti-Japanese Army (察哈尔民众抗日同盟军) consisted mostly of former Northwestern Army units under Feng Yuxiang, troops from Fang Zhenwu's Resisting Japan and Saving China Army, remnants of the provincial forces from Rehe, Anti-Japanese volunteers from Manchuria and local forces from Chahar and Suiyuan.  Even the Japanese puppet Liu Guitang switched sides, joining the Chahar People's Anti-Japanese Army, as did the Suiyuan bandit leader Wang Ying.

See also
 Actions in Inner Mongolia (1933-36)
 Order of Battle Anti-Japanese Allied Army Campaign of 1933

References

Sources
 International Military Tribunal for the Far East, Chapter 5: Japanese Aggression Against China
 中国抗日战争正面战场作战记 (China's Anti-Japanese War Combat Operations)
 Guo Rugui, editor-in-chief Huang Yuzhang
 Jiangsu People's Publishing House
 Date published : 2005-7-1
 
 Online in Chinese: https://web.archive.org/web/20090116005113/http://www.wehoo.net/book/wlwh/a30012/A0170.htm

Chahar People's Anti-Japanese Army
History of Zhangjiakou
Military units and formations established in 1933
1933 establishments in China
Military units and formations disestablished in 1933